The 1956 United States Senate special election in Colorado took place on November 6, 1956. Incumbent Republican Senator Eugene Millikin declined to seek re-election to a third term and a competitive election ensued. Former Congressman John A. Carroll, in his third consecutive bid for the Senate, narrowly defeated former U.S. Secretary of Agriculture Charles F. Brannan in the Democratic primary and advanced to the general election, where he faced Governor Dan Thornton, the Republican nominee. Despite Democratic presidential nominee Adlai Stevenson's poor performance in Colorado, state-level Democrats fared much better. Carroll ended up narrowly defeating Thornton, winning his only term in the U.S. Senate.

Democratic primary

Candidates
 John A. Carroll, former U.S. Congressman from Colorado's 1st congressional district, 1950 and 1954 Democratic nominee for the U.S. Senate
 Charles F. Brannan, former U.S. Secretary of Agriculture

Results

Republican primary

Candidates
 Dan Thornton, former Governor

Results

General election

Results

References

1956
Colorado
United States Senate